Ty Knott (born  December 9, 1965) is an American football Wide receivers coach and Special teams coordinator for the Seattle Sea Dragons of the XFL.

Early life
Knott was born on December 9, 1965 in Los Angeles, California. He attended the Oregon Institute of Technology where he played as a defensive back.

Career
Knott worked as an assistant at Whittier College, Indiana University, Mt. San Antonio College, and Greenville College, University of Minnesota Crookston, Texas Southern University and, Saint Mary of the Woods College

In the National Football League, Knott was an offensive assistant for the Jacksonville Jaguars in 2002. A year later, he became the defensive quality control coach for the New Orleans Saints, a position he served from 2003 to 2005. He was hired as the offensive quality control coach of the Green Bay Packers in 2006, but was fired after the 2008 season. In 2009 and 2010, he was the Director of Player Development for the San Francisco 49ers, where he worked with head coach Mike Singletary.

In 2018, Knott reunited with Singletary on the Memphis Express of the Alliance of American Football, where Knott served as running backs coach and special teams coordinator. The following year, he became assistant head coach and tight ends coach for the Los Angeles Wildcats of the XFL.  

In November 2021 Knott was announced as the inaugural Head Sprint Football Coach at Saint Mary of the Woods College, as of April 2022 Knott is no longer at the university, having never coached a game for the school.

Starting in 2022 Knott served as the offensive coordinator and quarterback coach for Bentley University Football Team a NCAA Division II program. 

Knott was officially hired by the Seattle Sea Dragons on September 13, 2022

References

Sportspeople from Los Angeles
Green Bay Packers coaches
New Orleans Saints coaches
Memphis Express (American football) coaches
Jacksonville Jaguars coaches
Oregon Tech Hustlin' Owls football players
Los Angeles Wildcats coaches
Living people
1965 births
Coaches of American football from California
Players of American football from Los Angeles
Sports coaches from Los Angeles